The N2 Gateway Housing Pilot Project is a large housebuilding project under construction in Cape Town, South Africa. It has been labelled by the national government's former Housing Minister Lindiwe Sisulu as "the biggest housing project ever undertaken by any Government." Even though it is a joint endeavour by the National Department of Housing, the provincial government of the Western Cape and the City of Cape Town, a private company, Thubelisha, has been outsourced to find contractors, manage, and implement the entire project. Thubelisha estimates that some 25,000 units will be constructed, about 70% of which will be allocated to shack-dwellers, and 30% to backyard dwellers on the municipal housing waiting lists. Delft, 40 km outside of Cape Town, is the main site of the Project.

The N2 Gateway is a highly controversial project and has been criticised by the Geneva-based Centre on Housing Rights and Evictions, by the South African Auditor General, by popular organisations such as the Western Cape Anti-Eviction Campaign, by Constitutional Court experts such as Pierre De Vos and by affected residents themselves.

Its detractors claim that the N2 Gateway is a beautification project for the 2010 FIFA World Cup. They cite government documents prioritising the development in light of its visibility near to the Cape Town Airport. They also cite the mass evictions that have taken place moving shackdwellers off the N2 corridor into Delft.

The South African government has stated that 14,000 homes housing 70,000 people at a cost of R2 billion was delivered by 2015.

Joe Slovo Phase 1 

To make way for Joe Slovo Phase 1 (a.k.a. N2 Gateway Phase 1), about 1,000 Joe Slovo residents were moved to Temporary Relocation Areas (TRAs) in Delft. After the January 2005 fire, which destroyed 3000 shacks and made 12,000 people homeless, Joe Slovo residents were promised priority in the allocation of N2 Gateway housing. The original plan was for 12,000 rental units to be built during Joe Slovo Phase 1 on the land taken during a massive fire in Joe Slovo in January 2005. Eventually, only 705 houses in that phase were built. It is reported that only one Joe Slovo resident was able to afford the flats whose rents skyrocketed and forced new tenants into a year-long rent boycott. The boycott has been supported by residents of Joe Slovo Informal Settlement, social movements, such as the Anti-Eviction Campaign, and civil society.
 The Western Cape Housing MEC has recently admitted major structural defects to the Phase 1 flats saying that they may have to be demolished.

Joe Slovo Informal Settlement – Phase 2 & 3 

With Phase 1 of the N2 Gateway completed, the National Government ordered the eviction of the remaining 20,000 shackdwellers to Temporary Relocation Areas in Delft (see section below). Joe Slovo residents have opposed government's order that they be forcibly removed. Residents refused to be moved claiming that the government was not getting rid of the slums but just moving them far away to Deflt where there are no jobs, few schools and a higher rate of crime.
It is reported that residents who had willingly moved to Delft after the fire in 2005 have lost their jobs because they cannot afford transport into Cape Town and since there is no railway line in Delft.

After a Cape High Court ruling by controversial judge John Hlophe in favour of the Government, many experts in constitutional law have claimed the ruling to be unjust and against the South African Constitution.

Since then, residents have appealed the decision and taken it to the South African Constitutional Court. In August 2008, about 200 Joe Slovo residents travelled by train, spent the night at the Methodist Church in Braamfontein, and arrived at the Constitutional Court to protest proposed evictions. They were accompanied in solidarity by the Anti-Eviction Campaign as well as residents from Symphony Way, an informal settlement that is also in conflict with the government over the N2 Gateway Housing Project.

The community law centre of the University of the Western Cape and the Centre on Housing Rights and Evictions were admitted as friends of the court in support of Joe Slovo residents. Judgment in the case was reserved in August 2008.

On 10 June 2009, the Constitutional Court ruled in favour of the eviction of Joe Slovo residents but only based on certain conditions including that 70% of homes built on Joe Slovo land be allocated to Joe Slovo residents, that government must enter into consultation with residents, and that temporary relocation areas where residents were to be moved be of higher quality.

In August 2009, new Minister for Human Settlements, Tokyo Sexwale, placed the eviction of residents on hold while Joe Slovo.
 In September 2009, reports surfaced that the Constitutional Court had quietly issued a new order suspending the eviction of Joe Slovo residents until further notice.

BNG Houses in Delft

Temporary Relocation Areas in Delft 

There are two Temporary Relocation Areas (TRAs) or transit camps that are connected to the N2 Gateway project in Delft.
The Delft TRA (nicknamed Tsunami and Thubelisha), which was originally built by the ANC-led City of Cape Town for Joe Slovo fire victims and is now managed by Thubelisha Homes on behalf of the National Government, has become a centerpiece of the N2 Gateway strategy. It houses shack-dwellers who have been forcibly or voluntarily moved from shack settlements such as those in Joe Slovo, Khayelitsha, Crossroads, Nyanga and Gugulethu. According to a study of Tsunami by the Development Action Group, the establishment of the Delft TRA:
 Has increased vulnerability of the households affected by the Joe Slovo fire,
 Has heightened community conflict
 Has and has had a huge financial cost to the municipality and possibly also to other government departments. 
According to DAG, in light of these costs and conditions, the policy intention is not achieved and the expense of establishing the TRA cannot be justified.

In 2007, Chris Harris, a professor in the department of geological sciences at UCT, found chrysotile and crocidolite (a.k.a. asbestos) in material found in the Tsunami TRA.

The other TRA is the Symphony Way TRA which has nicknamed 'Blikkiesdorp' (or 'Tin Can Town') by residents as well as pavement dwellers from a nearby informal settlement. This TRA is built and managed by the DA-led City of Cape Town. Symphony Way TRA is criticised for its barbed-wire fencing, police-controlled access to the camp, and its erosion of social networks.

Criticism 

The N2 Gateway Housing Project has been mired in controversy. The Auditor General Report on the project found mismanagement and widespread deficiencies in the planning, accounting, design, construction, and execution of the housing development project. The Western Cape Housing MEC, Bonginkosi Madikizela, has admitted to serious defects in the N2 Gateway Phase 1 Flats saying that "Some of the units, it will not actually help to fix them. I think a possible solution which is something very difficult to do would be just to demolish the building you know and start afresh.

In September 2009, the UN affiliated Centre on Housing Rights and Evictions (COHRE) published a significant report criticising the N2 Gateway Project for its housing rights violations and for its lack of consultation with poor residents affected by the project.

Photographs of the Projects and Affected Communities 
 Blikkiesdorp Photos

Reports on the N2 Gateway 
 2009 Report on the N2 Gateway by the Centre on Housing Rights and Evictions (COHRE)
 Western Cape Housing Crisis: Writings on Joe Slovo and Delft by Martin Legassick, February 2008
 Housing and Evictions at the N2 Gateway Project in Delft by Kerry Chance, May 2008
 The global governance response to informal settlements – relieving or deepening marginalisation? by Marie Huchzermeyer
 Auditor-General: Report on the Special Audit of the N2 Gateway Project at the National Department of Housing by Auditor-General
 The Reverse Side of the Medal: About the 2010 FIFA World Cup and the Beautification of the N2 in Cape Town by Caroline Newton in Urban Forum

See also 
 Joe Slovo Informal Settlement
 Symphony Way
 Delft
 N2 Gateway occupations

References 

Human habitats
Cape Town
Politics of South Africa
Urban planning in South Africa
Housing in South Africa